Strawn is a city in Palo Pinto County, Texas, United States. The population was 653 at the 2010 census. Strawn, on State highways 16 and 108, Farm Road 2372, and the Missouri Pacific Railroad in southwestern Palo Pinto County, was one of several towns developed about 1880 when the Texas and Pacific Railway began service. The site, known earlier as North Fork for its location on Palo Pinto Creek, was laid out on the land of two early ranchers, Stephen Bethel Strawn and James N. Stuart. Stuart built the area's first house in 1875. A community to the west, Russell's Pocket, and one to the east, Davidsonville, were merged to form Strawn.

Geography

Climate
The climate in this area is characterized by hot, humid summers and generally mild to cool winters.  According to the Köppen Climate Classification system, Strawn has a humid subtropical climate, abbreviated "Cfa" on climate maps.

Demographics

2020 census

As of the 2020 United States census, there were 540 people, 282 households, and 185 families residing in the city.

2000 census
As of the census of 2000, there were 739 people, 299 households, and 194 families residing in the city. The population density was 938.1 people per square mile (361.2/km). There were 354 housing units at an average density of 449.4 per square mile (173.0/km). The racial makeup of the city was 81.06% White, 0.27% African American, 0.54% Native American, 0.14% Asian, 0.54% Pacific Islander, 15.56% from other races, and 1.89% from two or more races. Hispanic or Latino of any race were 24.36% of the population.

There were 299 households, out of which 33.4% had children under the age of 18 living with them, 45.2% were married couples living together, 12.0% had a female householder with no husband present, and 35.1% were non-families. 33.4% of all households were made up of individuals, and 18.4% had someone living alone who was 65 years of age or older. The average household size was 2.47 and the average family size was 3.14.

In the city, the population was spread out, with 30.0% under the age of 18, 8.5% from 18 to 24, 27.3% from 25 to 44, 18.0% from 45 to 64, and 16.1% who were 65 years of age or older. The median age was 36 years. For every 100 females, there were 97.6 males. For every 100 females age 18 and over, there were 87.3 males.

The median income for a household in the city was $26,618, and the median income for a family was $30,268. Males had a median income of $30,000 versus $17,232 for females. The per capita income for the city was $13,707. About 7.9% of families and 14.9% of the population were below the poverty line, including 12.3% of those under age 18 and 17.8% of those age 65 or over.

Education
The City of Strawn is served by the Strawn Independent School District.

Photo Gallery

References

External links

 City website

Cities in Palo Pinto County, Texas
Cities in Texas